Lake Isabella – Cal Brewer Memorial Airport  is a public use airport located one nautical mile (2 km) east of the central business district of Lake Isabella, in Isabella County, Michigan, United States. The airport is owned by the Village of Lake Isabella. It was formerly known as Lake Isabella Airpark.

Facilities and aircraft 
The airport covers an area of 18 acres (7 ha) at an elevation of 886 feet (270 m) above mean sea level. It has one runway designated 11/29 with an asphalt surface measuring 2,582 by 50 feet (787 x 15 m).

For the 12-month period ending December 31, 2010, the airport had 1,264 general aviation aircraft operations, an average of 24 per week. At that time there were nine aircraft based at this airport, all single-engine.

References

External links 
 Aerial image as of April 1998 from USGS The National Map

Airports in Michigan
Buildings and structures in Isabella County, Michigan
Transportation in Isabella County, Michigan